is a type of tsukemono (Japanese pickle). It is made from thin strips of ginger pickled in umezu, the vinegary pickling solution used to make umeboshi. The red color is traditionally derived from red perilla (Perilla frutescens var. crispa). Commercial beni shōga often derives its hue from artificial coloring, to a garish effect. It is served with many Japanese dishes, including gyūdon, okonomiyaki, and yakisoba.

References

See also

 Gari (ginger)
 

Japanese pickles
Ginger dishes